Marin Mornar (born 26 March 1993) is a Croatian professional basketball player for Kongsberg Miners of the BLNO. He plays the Power forward position.

College career
As a senior at Loyola Marymount in 2015-16 Mornar averaged 7.6 points, 4.0 rebounds and 0.7 assists in 22.5 minutes in 30 appearances.

Professional career
On August 16, 2019, he signed with Macedonian basketball club MZT Skopje. On October 1, 2020, he signed with the Kongsberg Miners of the Norwegian league.

References

External links
 Marin Mornar at realgm.com
 Marin Mornar at eurobasket.com
 Marin Mornar at ESPN

1993 births
Living people
Basketball players from Zagreb
Power forwards (basketball)
Croatian men's basketball players
Loyola Marymount Lions men's basketball players